Meskin may refer to:

 Aharon Meskin, Israeli actor
 Meskin, Gilan, a village in Gilan Province, Iran
 Boneh-ye Meskin, a village in Khuzestan Province, Iran
 Meskin, Sistan and Baluchestan, a village in Sistan and Baluchestan Province, Iran
 Meskin, West Azerbaijan, a village in West Azerbaijan Province, Iran
 Mort Meskin, American comic book artist